Dig Up the Dead is the second official full-length album from Seattle, Washington, indie-rock band Mansions.

In the winter of 2009 through the early spring of 2010, Mansions worked on demos for the album in Winston-Salem, North Carolina. In April 2010, recording took place in Christopher's parents' house in Louisville, Kentucky. Additional recording and mixing took place back in North Carolina.

Track listing

 "Dig Up The Dead" - 3:59
 "Blackest Sky" - 3:24
 "Not My Blood" - 3:46
 "City Don't Care" - 3:43
 "Call Me When It's Over" - 3:09
 "Wormhole" - 3:15
 "Close That Door" - 3:12
 "Seven Years" - 3:34
 "You Got Cool" - 3:32
 "Yer Voice" - 3:34

Personnel
All songs written by Christopher Browder
Christopher Browder - Vocals, guitar, bass, percussion
Robin Dove - Vocals (on "Not My Blood", "Close That Door", "Seven Years", and "You Got Cool")
Salvatore Cassato - Drums (on "Blackest Sky", "Not My Blood", "You Got Cool", and "Yer Voice")
Bryan Whiteman - Bass (on "Blackest Sky" and "Not My Blood")

Technical
Christopher Browder - Production, Recording, and Mixing.
Robin Dove - Additional Production
Joe LaPorta - Mastering

Artwork
Patrick Leger - Cover Illustration
Christopher Browder & Chris Hansen - Layout

Vinyl release

The album was released on vinyl through Clifton Motel. The vinyl edition features a bonus track not included on the CD version.

Certain pre-orders of the vinyl came with a bonus disc, including acoustic versions of every song from Dig Up The Dead. First 50 orders came with an 8 1/2" x 11" letterpress art print designed by Christopher Browder.

References

2011 albums
Mansions (band) albums